is a Japanese footballer currently playing as a midfielder for V-Varen Nagasaki.

Club career
Nishino made his professional debut in a 2–1 Emperor's Cup win against Hokkaido Consadole Sapporo.

Career statistics

Club
.

Notes

References

External links

2002 births
Living people
Association football people from Nagasaki Prefecture
Japanese footballers
Association football midfielders
V-Varen Nagasaki players